Ryton Woodside is a small settlement near the town of Ryton, Tyne and Wear. It is near the A659 road. Formerly designated as a township, it was described as a "straggling hamlet', in the 19th century, when its population varied from 885 people in 1801 to 1106 people in 1891. It covered an area of 2813 acres at that time. Ryton Woodside is north east of Greenside and south of Ryton.

References

Villages in Tyne and Wear
Ryton, Tyne and Wear